The 1993 Utah Utes football team represented the University of Utah as a member of the Western Athletic Conference (WAC) during the 1993 NCAA Division I-A football season. In their fourth season under head coach Ron McBride, the Utes compiled an overall record of 7–5 record with a mark of 5–3 against conference opponents, tied for fourth place in the WAC, and were outscored by their opponents 396 to 390. Utah was invited to the Freedom Bowl, where they lost to the USC. The team played home games at Robert Rice Stadium in Salt Lake City.

In the Holy War rivalry, defeated the BYU, 34–31, in Provo, Utah. It was  the first win for the Utes the series since 1988 and the first at BYU since 1971.

Schedule

Personnel

Season summary

at BYU

Utah's first win in Provo since 1971

Freedom Bowl (vs USC)

After the season

NFL Draft
Two Utah players were selected in the 1994 NFL Draft, including future pro bowler Jamal Anderson.

References

External links
 Official game program: Idaho at Utah – October 2, 1993

Utah
Utah Utes football seasons
Utah Utes football